"Doo Wop (That Thing)" is a song recorded by American recording artist Lauryn Hill for her debut solo studio album The Miseducation of Lauryn Hill (1998). It was written and produced by Hill. The song was released as the lead single from The Miseducation of Lauryn Hill on August 10, 1998, by Ruffhouse Records and Columbia Records. No commercial release was originally intended for the single in the US, but limited-quantity physical formats were issued two months later, on October 27.

"Doo Wop (That Thing)" became Hill's first and only US Billboard Hot 100 number-one hit. It became the first US number-one written, produced and recorded by one sole woman since Debbie Gibson's "Lost in Your Eyes" (1989). It debuted atop the Billboard Hot 100, making it the tenth song in the chart's history to do so, the first debut single to do so, and the first solo hip hop song to do so. It also marked the first song by a female rapper to peak at number one on the Hot 100, and remained the only solo song by a female rapper to debut at number one for nearly a quarter of century afterwards. The song stayed at number one for two weeks, setting the record for the longest-running number one by a solo female rapper, holding that record for almost 19 years.

Critically acclaimed, "Doo Wop (That Thing)" was named the best single of the year by Rolling Stone. It went on to win Best Female R&B Vocal Performance and Best R&B Song at the 41st Annual Grammy Awards (1999). According to Apple Music, which streams a censored version it is one of the most streamed songs of the 1990s. NPR named it one of the 300 most important songs of the 20th century. In 2021, "Doo Wop (That Thing)" ranked number 49 on Rolling Stone's 500 Greatest Songs of All Time. The accompanying music video for "Doo Wop (That Thing)" won four awards at the 1999 MTV Video Music Awards, including the top prize Video of the Year, becoming the first hip hop video to win the award, and made Hill the first solo black artist to win. At the Soul Train Music Awards, the video was awarded the Michael Jackson Award for Best R&B/Soul or Rap Music Video. VH1 and Slant Magazine have both ranked it as one of the 100 greatest music videos, with the latter ranking it as the 20th greatest music video of all time.

Background
The hip hop and R&B song is a warning from Lauryn Hill to African-American men and women caught in "the struggle". Both the women who "[try to] be a hard rock when they really are a gem", and the men who are "more concerned with his rims, and his Timbs, than  women", are admonished by Hill, who warns them not to allow "that thing" to ruin their lives. The chorus seems to promote egalitarianism between the sexes, but the overall message of the lyrics has been described as conservative.

In terms of production value, Hill borrows heavily from elements of soul music and doo-wop, lending credence to the song's title. In its official album and single release, several of the song's lyrics are censored, though the original words can be found in the liners. The only noted semi-official release of the uncensored version is in a 12-inch promo labelled as "(Album Version)" (different from the 5:21 version) at 4 minutes in length.

Commercial performance
In the United States, "Doo Wop (That Thing)" debuted at number one on the Billboard Hot 100, making it the tenth song in the chart's history to debut atop the chart. The track became the first single since Debbie Gibson's 1989 single "Lost in Your Eyes" to reach number one in the US, that was written, produced and recorded by one sole woman. Hill joined Roberta Flack, Linda Goldstein, and Sinéad O'Connor as the only women at the time to solely produce a number one single, and joined the latter three woman along with Valerie Simpson and Ellie Greenwich as the sixth woman overall to produce a number one single.

It marked the first time that a female rapper peaked or debuted at number one on the Billboard Hot 100 chart. "Doo Wop (That Thing)" also became the first debut single to enter atop the chart. Additionally, it was the first and only solo hip hop song to debut at number one, until "Not Afraid" by Eminem debuted atop the chart in 2010. "Doo Wop (That Thing)" remained the only single by a female rapper to debut atop the chart until Nicki Minaj's "Trollz" with 6ix9ine began at number one in 2020. While the song remained the only solo release by a female rapper to debut at number one, until Minaj's "Super Freaky Girl" debuted atop the Hot 100, matching the feat 24 years later.

It stayed at number one for two weeks in November 1998, making Hill the third woman unaccompanied by another artist to do so with a song that debuted at number one, following Mariah Carey and Celine Dion. The song set the record for the longest-running number one by a solo female rapper, holding that record for almost 19 years, until it was surpassed by Cardi B's single "Bodak Yellow", which stayed atop the Hot 100 chart for three weeks.

"Doo Wop (That Thing)" also peaked atop Billboards Hot Rap Songs chart, making her the first solo female artist to top both charts simultaneously, and remained the sole single by a unaccompanied female artist to do so, until it was matched by Cardi B's "Up" in 2021. On the R&B Singles chart, it peaked at number two for three weeks in November 1998, and reached 50 million audience impressions on radio, however it was held out of the top spot by "Nobody's Supposed to Be Here" by Deborah Cox.

The song experienced similar success abroad, reaching number one in Iceland, and peaking within the top ten in various other countries worldwide. In the United Kingdom the song peaked at number three, debuted at number one on the UK Hip Hop and R&B Chart, and has been certified Platinum by the British Phonographic Industry. According to Apple Music, It is one of the most streamed songs of the 1990s.

Accolades
At the 41st Annual Grammy Awards, "Doo Wop (That Thing)" won two awards: Best R&B Song and Best Female R&B Vocal Performance. The success of "Doo Wop (That Thing)" and The Miseducation of Lauryn Hill established Hill as a success outside of her group, The Fugees. In 1999, "Doo Wop (That Thing)" was ranked at number two on The Village Voices Pazz & Jop annual critics' poll, after Fatboy Slims "The Rockafeller Skank".

The song's music video won four 1999 MTV Video Music Awards for: Best Female Video, Best R&B Video, Best Art Direction, and Video of the Year; with her win for Video of the Year, "Doo Wop (That Thing)" became the first hip hop video to win the award, and made Hill the first solo black artist to win, and second overall following TLC (1995).

Music video
The song's music video was Directed by Monty Whitebloom & Andy Delaney, Bigtv, and filmed in Manhattan's Washington Heights in New York City, with the video showing two Hills singing side by side at a block party. On the left side of the split screen, the 1967 Hill dressed in full retro-styled attire, complete with a beehive and a zebra-printed dress, she pays homage to classic R&B and doo wop, and on the right side of the screen, the 1998 Hill is shown in a homage to hip hop culture. Slant Magazine's Paul Schrodt praised the "Doo Wop (That Thing)" music video, stating "The resulting split-screen music video is the most flabbergasting testament to what the neo soul movement is all about."

Legacy

Recognition
"Doo Wop (That Thing)" is included as number 359 on the Songs of the Century list by the Recording Industry Association of America/National Endowment for the Arts. The song was named as the 21st greatest hip hop song of all time by BBC, being one of the two only songs by female artist to make the list. NPR named it one of the most important songs of the 20th century. In 2021, the song ranked number 49 on Rolling Stone's 500 Greatest Songs of All Time list. XXL also included it among the 60 essential songs by female rappers.

In 2001, the song's accompanying music video was placed at number 71 on the VH1 list of the '100 Greatest Videos'. PopSugar named it the 15th most iconic music video of the 90s, while UDiscover Music listed it as one of the music videos that defined the 90s. In 2021, Slant Magazine ranked "Doo Wop (That Thing)" at number 20 on their list of the '100 Greatest Videos'.

Sampling and freestyles
In 2014, musician Drake sampled the song on his single "Draft Day", the song was later included on his 2019 compilation album Care Package. In 2021, Kanye West also sampled it for his single "Believe What I Say", from his tenth studio album Donda. It has also been interpolated by the recording artist Lizzo, on the song "Break Up Twice" from her fourth studio album Special.

The song's instrumental has also been used in freestyles by rappers DaBaby, and Jamaican musician Shenseea.

Cover versions
Singer Amy Winehouse, covered the song as part of a mashup with her song, "He Can Only Hold Her", during live concerts during 2006-2008. Rihanna also covered the song while touring on Kanye West's Glow in the Dark Tour, in 2008. In 2012, R&B singer Teyana Taylor, released the mixtape, The Misunderstanding of Teyana Taylor, which was inspired by Hill and titled after her album, The Miseducation of Lauryn Hill; one of the tracks, "Lauryn's Interlude", features Taylor performing a shortened, a capella cover of the song. Alicia Keys performed a cover of the track in a melody with other popular songs at the 61st Annual Grammy Awards. Folk singer Devendra Banhart has also covered the song during multiple live performances, including at the music festivals, Bonnaroo and Pitchfork Music Festival.

In 2014, the Glee episode "The Back-up Plan", includes a cover version of the song performed by Mercedes Jones (Amber Riley) and Santana Lopez (Naya Rivera). The 2015 film, Pitch Perfect 2, included a cover of the song by singer Ester Dean, who performed the hook of the song in the 'Riff Off'.

Track listings

US CD and cassette single
 "Doo Wop (That Thing)"
 "Lost Ones" (remix)

US maxi-CD single
 "Doo Wop (That Thing)" (radio edit)
 "Lost Ones" (album version)
 "Lost Ones" (remix)
 "Doo Wop (That Thing)" (instrumental)
 "Doo Wop (That Thing)" (a cappella)

UK CD1
 "Doo Wop (That Thing)" (radio edit)
 "Doo Wop (That Thing)" (Gordon's Dub)
 "Doo Wop (That Thing)" (instrumental)

UK CD2
 "Doo Wop (That Thing)" (album version)
 "Lost Ones"
 "Forgive Them Father"

UK cassette single and European CD single
 "Doo Wop (That Thing)" (radio edit)
 "Lost Ones"

Australian CD single
 "Doo Wop (That Thing)" (radio edit) – 4:00
 "Lost Ones" – 5:33
 "Doo Wop (That Thing)" (Gordon's Dub) – 4:00
 "Tell Him" (live) – 4:40
 "Can't Take My Eyes Off You" – 4:03

Credits and personnel
Credits are taken from The Miseducation of Lauryn Hill album booklet.

Studios
 Recorded at Marley Music, Inc. (Kingston, Jamaica) and Chung King Studios (New York City)
 Mixed at Sony Music Studios (New York City)
 Mastered at Powers House of Sound (New York City)

Personnel

 Lauryn Hill – writing, lead vocals, production, arrangement
 Lenesha Randolph – background vocals
 Jeni Fujita – background vocals
 Rasheem "Kilo" Pugh – background vocals
 Fundisha Johnson – background vocals
 James Poyser – background vocals, piano, Rhodes, celesta, Wurlitzer, electric piano
 Ché Guevara – drum programming
 Vada Nobles – additional drum programming
 DJ Supreme – DJ elements
 Everol Wray – trumpet
 Nambo Robinson – trombone
 Dean Fraser – saxophone
 Indigo Quartet – strings
 Commissioner Gordon – recording, mixing, mix engineering
 Warren Riker – recording
 Errol Brown – recording assistant
 Storm Jefferson – recording assistant
 Herb Powers, Jr. – mastering

Charts

Weekly charts

Year-end charts

Certifications

Release history

References

1998 debut singles
1998 songs
Billboard Hot 100 number-one singles
Doo-wop songs
Lauryn Hill songs
MTV Video Music Award for Best Female Video
MTV Video of the Year Award
Music videos directed by Big T.V.
Number-one singles in Iceland
Song recordings produced by Lauryn Hill
Songs written by Lauryn Hill